Glycerol-3-phosphate acyltransferase 4 is a protein that in humans is encoded by the GPAT4 gene.

Function

GPAT4 is involved in the biosynthesis of triglycerides. The majority of triglycerides are synthesised from glycerol 3-phosphate (G3P) via the addition of three fatty acyl-CoA substrates, which are made from fatty acids. The first of these additions is catalysed by G3P acyltransferases (GPATs: EC 2.3.1.15), including GPAT4, yielding lysophosphatidic acid. GPAT4 has been shown to be important for lactation, with QTL for several milk production and composition traits observed at this locus in cattle.

References

Further reading